"Hello Hooray" is a song written by Canadian singer-songwriter Rolf Kempf, and first recorded by Judy Collins on her 1968 album Who Knows Where the Time Goes. Its most famous rendition was by the band Alice Cooper, who covered it on their 1973 album Billion Dollar Babies. The Alice Cooper version was released as a single (now spelled "Hello Hurray"), and reached #35 on the Billboard Hot 100. It also saw success internationally, reaching #6 on the UK Singles Chart, #6 in the Netherlands on the MegaCharts, #13 on Germany's Media Control Chart, #14 on the Ireland chart, #16 on the Austria chart,   and #95 on Australia's ARIA chart.

The Alice Cooper version appeared in the film X-Men: Days of Future Past.

Other versions
Meg Christian released a version of the song on her 1974 album, I Know You Know.
Pig released a version on his 1992 album, A Stroll in the Pork.
Frankenstein Drag Queens from Planet 13 released a version on their 2006 box set, Little Box of Horrors.

References

1973 singles
Alice Cooper songs
Judy Collins songs
Warner Records singles
Song recordings produced by Bob Ezrin